Cho Yoon-woo (born July 27, 1991) is a South Korean actor. He made his acting debut in the tvN's television series Cool Guys, Hot Ramen (2011). He was also part of the ensemble cast of another romantic comedy television series on the same cable channel, Dating Agency: Cyrano (2013). He  is best known for starring in the television series Hwarang: The Poet Warrior Youth (2016–17)

Filmography

Television series

Films

References

External links 
 Cho Yoon-woo at King Kong Entertainment 

1991 births
Living people
South Korean male television actors
South Korean male film actors
South Korean male web series actors
King Kong by Starship artists